Shri Ram Narayan Sahu is an Indian politician from BJP. In the 2004 Indian Rajya Sabha elections, he was elected as a Member of the Parliament of India representing Uttar Pradesh in the Rajya Sabha, the upper house of the Indian Parliament. His term was set for 2004–2010. He was not re-elected in the 2010 elections, although it is not clear if he ran again.

External links
 Profile on Rajya Sabha website

Samajwadi Party politicians
Rajya Sabha members from Uttar Pradesh
Living people
Year of birth missing (living people)
Bharatiya Janata Party politicians from Uttar Pradesh